The Nusrat Jahan Mosque or The Nusrat Djahan Moske is an Ahmadiyya Mosque built on the outskirts of Copenhagen, Denmark in Hvidovre.

The Nusrat Jahan mosque  is the first mosque to be built in Denmark in 1967. This mosque was financed solely by the female members of the Ahmadiyya Muslim Community in Denmark. The capacity of the mosque is 120 people.

The mosque is named after Nusrat Jahan Begum, the second wife of Mirza Ghulam Ahmad, The Promised Messiah and Mahdi.

History
The Ahmadiyya Muslim Community and its efforts began in early 1950s. At that time, an Ahmadi Muslim Missionary, Kamal Yousuf was appointed by the Ahmadiyya movement to begin in Denmark. He first toured Denmark in 1956.

In 1967, the Community published the first translation of the Quran in Danish. The main translator was Abdus Salam Madsen himself, whose publication was the sole translation available to the Danish public for over four decades. Until the late 1980s, Madsen was seen as the leading public figure of Islam in Denmark.

In 1966, roughly five days prior to construction, the Hvidovre Municipality revoked its initial permission to construct the mosque. On the other hand, the third caliph of the Community, Mirza Nasir Ahmad was due to arrive in the region, to lay its foundation. The mosque's architect, John Zachariassen, reported the situation to the then Prime Minister of Denmark, Jens Otto Krag. Krag gave a notice to ignore the municipal decision and to continue with the construction work. The foundation stone was finally laid on May 6, 1966, and the mosque, the construction of which gained widespread media attention, was inaugurated a year later by the caliph on July 21, 1967. The opening ceremony was attended by representatives of the Danish government.

References

1967 establishments in Denmark
Mosques completed in 1967
Ahmadiyya mosques
Buildings and structures in Hvidovre Municipality
Mosques in Denmark